Patricia Jean Johnson is a Professor of Microbiology at University of California, Los Angeles (UCLA). She works on the parasite Trichomonas vaginalis, which is responsible for the most prevalent sexually transmitted infections in the United States, Trichomoniasis. She was elected a member of the National Academy of Sciences (NAS) in 2019.

Early life and education 
Johnson grew up on a farm in Virginia. Johnson studied biology at Murray State University, where she specialised in molecular biology. She moved to the University of Michigan for her graduate studies, earning her doctorate in 1984.  She was supported by the Burroughs Wellcome fund. Her thesis investigated  the evolution of exons and introns in actin genes of sea urchins (Strongylocentrotus franciscanus, Strongylocentrotus purpuratus, and Lytechinus pictus).

Research and career 
After her PhD, Johnson was a postdoctoral researcher with Piet Borst at the Netherlands Cancer Institute. In the Netherlands Johnson worked on Trypanosoma. She then joined Rockefeller University, where she worked with Christian de Duve. She studied the parasite Trypanosoma brucei, the parasite that causes African trypanosomiasis. Johnson joined the University of California, Los Angeles as an assistant professor in 1988, and was promoted to professor in 1998. At the University of California, Johnson worked on bacterial evolution.

Johnson studies the molecular and cell biology of Trichomonas vaginalis, a parasite that causes trichomoniasis, one of the most prevalent sexually transmitted infections worldwide. Johnson cloned the first Trichomonas vaginalis gene in 1990. She first sequenced the genome of Trichomonas vaginalis in 2007, working with Jane M. Carlton at New York University. To sequence the gene required the efforts of 66 scientists working in 10 countries. Sequencing the genome revealed detailed information about the mechanism by which Trichomonas adheres to and kills human cells. It is estimated that 275 million people worldwide live with the parasite. She investigates the pathogenic mechanisms that permit Trichomonas vaginalis to establish infection. Her work considers new means of diagnosing and treating Trichomonas vaginalis.

Trichomonas vaginalis is one of the most divergent eukaryotes, so provides a good platform to study biodiversity. Johnson studies different aspects of trichomonad biology, including drug resistance, organelle biogenesis, gene expression, genomics and host-parasite interactions. Johnson is also investigating the link between Trichomonas vaginalis and prostate cancer. In 2014 she found that Trichomonas vaginalis secreted a protein that can invade benign cancerous prostate cells.

She serves as an associate editor of PLOS Pathogens.

Awards and honours 
 2004 National Institutes of Health (NIH) MERIT Award
2011 Elected to the American Society for Microbiology
 2019 Elected a member of the National Academy of Sciences

References

Scientists from Virginia
Murray State University alumni
University of Michigan alumni
20th-century American biologists
20th-century American women scientists
21st-century American chemists
21st-century American women scientists
American women biochemists
Members of the United States National Academy of Sciences
Year of birth missing (living people)
Living people
University of California, Los Angeles faculty